The Archiv for Mathematik og Naturvidenskab (translated: Archive of mathematics and natural science) was a scientific journal published in Oslo. Its first issue appeared in 1876, and was edited by the mathematician Sophus Lie, the physician , and the biologist Georg Ossian Sars, and published by Albert Cammermeyer. The last issue appeared in 1961.

Lie published his work on transformation groups (now called Lie groups) in the 1876 volume (p.19-57, 152-193).

References

Multilingual journals
Publications established in 1876
Publications disestablished in 1961
Multidisciplinary scientific journals